Najdi may refer to:
People of Najd 
Najdi (surname)
Najdi Arabic, a variety of the Arabic language, 
Najdi (sheep), a breed of sheep
Najdi!, a Macedonian search-engine